The following is a chronology of the top ten leaders in lifetime home runs in Major League Baseball. This includes any home runs hit by a player during official regular season games (i.e., excluding playoffs or exhibition games) in the National Association (1871–1875), National League (since 1876), the American Association (1882–1891), the Union Association (1884), the Players' League (1890), the American League (since 1901), and the Federal League (1914–1915).

The list helps contextualize the evolution of one of the most prized achievements in United States sports. In the early 1930s, Babe Ruth had almost 400 more home runs than the next player, his longtime teammate Lou Gehrig; when Joe DiMaggio retired in 1951, he was fifth on the all-time list.

Career home run leaders by year

Statistics updated through  season.

Leadership dates
Starting with Harry Stovey passing Charley Jones in August 1885, there have been seven changes of the career home run leader. Stovey held the title twice, having lost it to Dan Brouthers in June 1887 and then regaining it from Brouthers in August 1889. In the modern era—since the formation of the American League in 1901—there have only been four players who have held the title.

 indicates the player hit additional home runs after being passed.
 source material is unclear of Stovey's home run count when passing Brouthers

See also

Baseball statistics
List of Major League Baseball annual home run leaders
List of Major League Baseball progressive single-season home run leaders
500 home run club
List of Major League Baseball career home run leaders
List of Major League Baseball career hits leaders
List of Major League Baseball career total bases leaders
List of Major League Baseball career doubles leaders
List of Major League Baseball career triples leaders
The Year Babe Ruth Hit 104 Home Runs

Further reading

References

Major League Baseball records
Major League Baseball lists
Baseball record progressions